Sigma in cosmology is a property of galaxies used when trying to work out the mystery of galaxies and their supermassive black holes.

History
In the late 1990s the NUKER experts had made observations with a spectroscope of two galaxies, one of an active galaxy with an active galactic nucleus called NGC10-68 and a dormant galaxy named Andromeda.

The light from the centre in Andromeda galaxy was distorted, which proved the existence of super-massive black holes.

Other observations proved most galaxies had a similar centre whether it be active or dormant.

They then realised that the black holes must have something to do with a galaxy's formation, so they turned to something they thought was useless: the speed of the stars around the edge of the galaxy. This is sigma, the speed of the stars at the edge of the galaxy supposedly unaffected by the mass of the black hole at the centre.

Usage In Cosmology
The NUKER team calculated the sigma of several stars in different galaxies and the mass of the black hole at the (nucleus) centre. They expected no correlation what so ever. But when plotting their results on a Scatter diagram and drawing a line of best fit they ended up with a positive correlation. It appeared that the heavier the black hole at the centre, the faster the stars within the galaxy travelled.

This property helped them realise that a Supermassive black hole nucleus must be the reason for the galaxies in some way.
They saw that the clouds of gas before the galaxies compressed forming a black hole, the black hole would produce phenomenal amounts of energy which would force the rest of the galaxy away and form stars.

Sigma comes into use when the black hole gets heavier from the increased mass. The stars at the edge of the newly formed galaxy were revolving around at high speeds. The faster they were travelling, the heavier the black hole would have to be to force them away. Then once everything had been moved away from it, the black hole stops feeding.
The correlation above has been proven by the process of Galaxy formation and evolution. (also see Galaxies)

Formulation and Notation
Sigma is given by the Greek letter sigma in lower case with star velocity in subscript  (σν☉). In physics and mathematics lower case sigma means set or group. This is appropriate for the property sigma as it is a measurement of a group of star speeds.
The above correlation is given by-

[(Q2+(J/M)2≤M2)=106*]≈50 km/s(σν☉)

The black hole mass equal to 1,000,000 times the mass of the Sun is approximately equal to the sigma of a star travelling at 50 km/s.
The increase factor is

106n*101=xKm/s+50 km/s.

References

Physical cosmology